Cintano is a comune (municipality) in the Metropolitan City of Turin in the Italian region Piedmont, located about  north of Turin. 
 
Cintano borders the following municipalities: Castellamonte, Colleretto Castelnuovo, and Castelnuovo Nigra.

References

Cities and towns in Piedmont